Lucas Gabriel Albertengo (born 30 January 1991) is an Argentine professional footballer who plays as a forward for Argentine club Defensa y Justicia.

References

1991 births
Living people
Argentine sportspeople of Italian descent
Argentine footballers
Argentine expatriate footballers
People from Castellanos Department
Association football forwards
Atlético de Rafaela footballers
Club Atlético Independiente footballers
C.F. Monterrey players
Estudiantes de La Plata footballers
Newell's Old Boys footballers
Arsenal de Sarandí footballers
Defensa y Justicia footballers
Argentine Primera División players
Liga MX players
Expatriate footballers in Mexico
Argentine expatriate sportspeople in Mexico
Sportspeople from Santa Fe Province